Leucoma salicis, the white satin moth or satin moth, is a moth of the family Erebidae. The species was first described by Carl Linnaeus in his 1758 10th edition of Systema Naturae. It is found in Europe including the British Isles but not the far north. In the east it is found across the Palearctic to Japan. Also in North America where it was introduced in the 1920s.

Technical description and variation

The wingspan is 37–50 mm. White, sometimes with ochreous, or in the male even blackish costal margin; head and collar as well as the pectinations of the antennae dark. Tibiae and tarsi with broad black rings. The East-Asiatic species Leucoma candida (Staudinger, 1892) with different male genitalia structure, has much purer glossy white and entirely opaque, more thickly scaled, wings and is on the whole smaller, with narrower wings. From central and eastern Siberia, Mongolia, Amurland, Korea, China, Japan. Yellowish-grey specimens are ab. sohesti Capr. Specimens from Tian-shan with black pectinations of the antennae of the male are nigripennata Staudinger. ab. nigrociliata Fuchs has sharp black third of the costal margin and glossy black fringes; Germany, ab. rubicunda Strand has both the wings and hairy covering reddish, almost rose red at the costal and inner margins of the forewing (male); in southern Norway. Distribution of Leucoma salicis occupies most part of Eurasia south from the Polar Circle, excluding north-eastern Siberia.

Biology
The eggs are laid on tree trunks in clusters covered with a paper-like substance. Larvae are black with a row of light dorsal spots and a yellow lateral line. Segments four and five each with a pair of united fleshy pointed tubercles. The larvae feed on Salix and Populus species. Pupation is in a loose cocoon between leaves, the pupa being glossy black with white spots and yellow tufts or hair. The moth appears in June, July and August. The males already begin to fly before dusk in the evening and often swarm like snowflakes round the poplars and willows at country roads.

Found in half shady, damp locations, such as forest edges and hedges with their food plants, but also in avenues, parks and gardens. They are common, but only occur in small numbers. Leucoma salicis is also reported from outbreaks (population explosions), but these are known only from historical times.

References

External links

White satin moth at UKMoths
Fauna Europaea

Lepiforum e.V.

Lymantriinae
Moths described in 1758
Taxa named by Carl Linnaeus
Moths of Japan
Moths of Europe
Moths of North America
Moths of Asia